General Bryan may refer to:

Blackshear M. Bryan (1900–1977), U.S. Army lieutenant general
Goode Bryan (1811–1885), Confederate States Army brigadier general
William Bryan (North Carolina politician) (1725–1781), North Carolina Militia brigadier general in the American Revolutionary War